The Edmonton Rush are a lacrosse team based in Edmonton playing in the National Lacrosse League (NLL). The 2009 season was the 4th in franchise history.

Regular season

Conference standings

Game log
Reference:

Player stats
Reference:

Runners (Top 10)

Note: GP = Games played; G = Goals; A = Assists; Pts = Points; LB = Loose balls; PIM = Penalty minutes

Goaltenders
Note: GP = Games played; MIN = Minutes; W = Wins; L = Losses; GA = Goals against; Sv% = Save percentage; GAA = Goals against average

Transactions

New players
 Cam Bergman - acquired in trade
 Andrew Biers - acquired in trade
 Steve Dietrich - acquired in trade
 Greg Hinman - acquired in trade
 Spencer Martin - acquired in trade
 Chris McKay - acquired in trade
 Tim O'Brien - signed as free agent
 Lindsay Plunkett - acquired in trade

Players not returning
 Mac Allen - traded
 Troy Bonterre - traded
 Kyle Goundrey - released
 Kris Hartzell - traded
 Matt King - traded
 Ben Prepchuk - not playing in 2009
 Dan Stroup - released
 Brendan Thenhaus - traded
 Kurtis Wagar - traded

Trades

*Later traded to the Chicago Shamrox
**Later traded to the Washington Stealth
***Later traded to the Minnesota Swarm
****Later traded to the Boston Blazers

Entry draft
The 2008 NLL Entry Draft took place on September 7, 2008. The Rush selected the following players:

 Denotes player who never played in the NLL regular season or playoffs

Roster

See also
2009 NLL season

References

Edmonton